Puppet Master 4 is a 1993 direct-to-video horror film written by Charles Band among others, and directed by Jeff Burr. It is the fourth film in the Puppet Master franchise, a sequel to 1991's Puppet Master III, and stars Gordon Currie as a young prodigy who, along with his friends, played by Chandra West, Jason Adams and Teresa Hill, is attacked by demons; the animated puppets of Andre Toulon (Guy Rolfe) serve to protect the group, similar to the role they played in the prequel Toulon's Revenge, rather than terrorize, as they had in the first and second films. Originally, Puppet Master 4 was intended to have the subtitle The Demon.

Puppet Master 4, as well as the second, third, and fifth installments, were only available in DVD format through a Full Moon Features box set that has since been discontinued. However, in 2007, Full Moon reacquired the rights to the first five films, and the boxset has since been reissued and is available directly from the studio, as well as through several online retailers.

Plot
In the underworld of Hell, a demon lord named Sutekh sends forth a trio of diminutive servants called the Totems, magically controlled by his netherworld minions, to kill those who possess the secret of animation, including the magic André Toulon used to give his puppets life. It transpires also that a team of researchers working on the development of artificial intelligence are close to discovering Toulon's secret. Sutekh sends one of the Totems as a package to two of the researchers involved, Dr. Piper and Dr. Baker of the Phoenix Division, who are taken by surprise, killed and stripped of their souls by the foul creature.

One of the researchers, a talented young man named Rick Myers, is working as a caretaker at the Bodega Bay Inn and has also been using it for a place to conduct his experiments on the A.I. project. The same night Drs. Piper and Baker are murdered, Rick's friends Suzie, Lauren, and Cameron come to visit him. At dinner, Lauren, who is a psychic, finds Blade (who had been discovered earlier by Rick inside the house and is still animate) and then Toulon's old trunk, with the puppets, Toulons diary and some vials with the life-giving formula inside. Out of curiosity, Rick and his friends use the fluid on the puppets, and one by one they awaken; next to Blade, they find Pinhead, Six Shooter, Tunneler and Jester. (Torch, who joins the puppet cast in the sequel, makes no appearance here.)

Fascinated by the puppets' spontaneous reactions, and believing that the formula is the answer to the running AI projects, Rick wants to see how smart they are by playing a laser tag game with Pinhead and Tunneler. Cameron, who is competing with Rick for success, tries to use the formula's secret for his personal gain, and he and Lauren decide to use a strange gameboard found in the trunk to try and contact Toulon for its exact composition, whose recipe was not recorded in the diary. But the glowing pyramid icon which goes with the board is a conduit between the mortal world and the underworld; Sutekh uses the link to send two of his Totems to attack. Cameron and Lauren attempt to flee by car, but Cameron is ambushed by one of the Totems inside his car and killed, while Lauren manages to get back into the hotel. When Rick looks after Cameron, the Totem attacks him as well, but he manages to escape.

But inside the inn, the third Totem, sent in earlier by package, is also on the prowl. The puppets, intent on protecting Rick, search the hotel and soon manage to kill one of the Totems in the kitchen and, through its supervision link, its controller in the underworld. Then Toulon's spirit, who has been appearing around the hotel all night, tells the puppets to animate the Decapitron. Under Rick and Suzie's astonished eyes, the puppets move up to Rick's room, retrieve a box which contains yet another puppet with a soft plastic head, and revive it with the formula and a lightning strike. The two remaining Totems attack to disrupt the process, but one is electrocuted when Six Shooter uses a wire as a lariat to divert some of the lightning's power into it. Decapitron briefly awakens, and his head morphs into the likeness of Toulon, who explains to Rick the origin and the secret of the life-giving formula. The vial, however, turns out to be missing; immediately suspecting Cameron, Rick goes back to search his body, where he does find the vial.

Meanwhile, the last Totem corners the panicked Lauren and prepares to drain her life away when Suzie interferes and douses it with acid. Toulon speaks through Lauren, urging Rick to animate Decapitron to destroy the Totem, and Rick uses his computer to divert power from his generator into Decapitron, bringing him to life. As the Totem attacks, Decapitron exchanges his plastic head for an electron-bolt launching system and destroys the creature. Afterwards, Toulon speaks to Rick yet again, surrendering custody of his puppets and the formula to him and promising his help in times of need.

Cast
 Guy Rolfe as André Toulon
 Gordon Currie as Rick Myers
 Chandra West as Susie
 Jason Adams as Cameron Phillips
 Teresa Hill as Lauren
 Felton Perry as Dr. Carl Baker
 Stacie Randall as Dr. Leslie Piper
 Michael Shamus Wiles as Stanley
 Jake McKinnon as Sutekh (uncredited)

Featured puppets
 Blade
 Pinhead
 Jester
 Tunneler
 Six Shooter
 Decapitron
 Totem
 Torch (poster only)
 Mephisto (Toulon poster only)

Timeline Issue

 In Toulon's Revenge, André Toulon escaped Berlin somewhere between 1942 and 1944. Toulon committed suicide on March 15, and the film mentioned the Eastern Front, whose conduct of operations didn't take place until summer of 1941. In this film, Toulon's diary recounts Major Krauss's death as being on April 7. Since in previously established timelines, Toulon made it to America almost one year after escaping, Toulon would have to had killed himself on March 15 either in 1943 up to 1945.
 The ending to part 2 of the franchise is not referenced, and the continuity does not match.
 Also, the trunk Rick and Cameron pull the puppets out of looks like it hasn't been touched in 50 years, as if this is the first time the puppets were found after the events of Axis of Evil and X: Axis Rising, despite evidence that shows this film to take place sometime after His Unholy Creations.

External links
 
 

1993 films
1993 horror films
Films directed by Jeff Burr
Puppet films
Full Moon Features films
Puppet Master (film series)
American sequel films
American supernatural horror films
Films scored by Richard Band
American direct-to-video films
Paramount Pictures direct-to-video films
1990s English-language films
1990s American films